Souroubea is a genus of flowering plants in the family Marcgraviaceae, native to southern Mexico, Central America, Trinidad, and northern South America. Some species are psychophilous (pollinated by butterflies in the day), and some are sphingophilous (pollinated by moths at night).

Species
Currently accepted species include:

Souroubea bicolor (Benth.) de Roon
Souroubea corallina (Mart.) de Roon
Souroubea crassipes (Triana & Planch.) Wittm.
Souroubea crassipetala de Roon
Souroubea dasystachya Gilg & Werderm.
Souroubea didyma Gilg
Souroubea exauriculata Delpino
Souroubea fragilis de Roon
Souroubea gilgii V.A.Richt.
Souroubea guianensis Aubl.
Souroubea intermedia de Roon
Souroubea loczyi (V.A.Richt.) de Roon
Souroubea pachyphylla Gilg
Souroubea peruviana Gilg
Souroubea platyadenia (Gilg) de Roon
Souroubea stichadenia de Roon
Souroubea sympetala Gilg
Souroubea vallicola Woodson ex de Roon
Souroubea venosa Schery

References

Marcgraviaceae
Ericales genera